Summer Vacation (Korean: 여름방학) is a South Korean “home vacation” reality show that aired on tvN every Friday at 21:50 (KST) starting from July 17, 2020.

Overview 
It is a reality show featuring Korean celebrities, Jung Yu-mi and Choi Woo-shik. They take a vacation in an unfamiliar location so as to recover from the stresses and strains of modern urban life. These celebrities also invite their other celebrity friends to stay at their countryside vacation home.

Episodes

References 

South Korean variety television shows
Korean-language television shows
Television series about vacationing
2020s South Korean television series